The Oakwood Estate is a house in Winchester, Kentucky.  It was listed on the National Register of Historic Places in 1979 as Alpheus Lewis House.  It is a one-story home on a raised basement, with Greek Revival details.

The Oakwood house is on the Lewis Estate and has a history that dates from the ante-bellum era. This house is on the banks of Stoner Creek, about a mile off of Wades Mill Rd.

At the time the house was built, it was home to Alpheus Lewis Sr., his wife and nine children. He was born in 1799. His father was a veteran of the Revolutionary War and a member of the House of Burgesses and acquired  of land which he divided among his sons. Alpheus built his house, which he later named Oakwood. He created a very successful wine business known as "A. Lewis and Sons". The story of Lewis' son, Alpheus ("Ack") Lewis Jr's time in the Civil War, made Lewis and his home well known in Kentucky.  

Captain Ack Lewis had important papers to deliver to the Confederate General, Braxton Bragg. His route took him past his parents' estate, where he stopped and his mother immediately took precautions by sending their most trusted servant, "Wash", to be stationed outside to look out for any Union troops. At about two in the morning, Wash gave the signal that Union troops were approaching the house, looking for Ack. His mother quickly threw his dirty Confederate clothes in the fire and hid him in the secret wine cellar through a trapdoor just as the troops knocked on the front door demanding to search the house. Mrs. Lewis answered and graciously welcomed them into the home. She served them the best wines from the cellars. It is said she treated them so well while they were at the house, they only made a partial search and left. Then, Ack got up from the cellar and made his escape.

The condition of Oakwood today is deteriorating with major instabilities in the structure. The backyard however may still have a rail fence made completely of stone which is quite a rarity. Behind it are the graves of Alpheus Lewis Sr. and his wife Theodosia.

References

Winchester Sun article
Excerpt from the diary of Theodosia Lewis
https://www.philadelphiabuildings.org/pab/app/pr_display.cfm/1031714

National Register of Historic Places in Clark County, Kentucky
Houses in Clark County, Kentucky
Houses on the National Register of Historic Places in Kentucky
1820 establishments in Kentucky
Greek Revival architecture in Kentucky
Houses completed in 1820